Scott Deroue (born 23 December 1995 in Nijkerkerveen) is a Dutch motorcycle racer. In 2017 he competes in the Supersport 300 World Championship aboard a Kawasaki Ninja 300. He was a Red Bull MotoGP Rookies Cup contestant in 2011, 2012 and 2013 and the British Motostar champion in 2015. He has also competed in the British National Superstock 600 Championship.

Career statistics

Red Bull MotoGP Rookies Cup

Races by year
(key) (Races in bold indicate pole position, races in italics indicate fastest lap)

Grand Prix motorcycle racing

By season

Races by year
(key) (Races in bold indicate pole position; races in italics indicate fastest lap)

References

External links

1995 births
Living people
Dutch motorcycle racers
Moto3 World Championship riders
People from Nijkerk
Supersport 300 World Championship riders
Sportspeople from Gelderland
21st-century Dutch people